William Dawson (born in Ireland), was mayor of Saint Paul, Minnesota, United States, from 1878 to 1881. He was born in County Cavan, Ireland on October 1, 1825. He was a successful banker. When he was elected as mayor, he became the first mayor to be Irish in Saint Paul. He died on February 19, 1901. He died poor after his Bank of Minnesota failed five years before he died. There is a two-acre park named after him in Saint Paul. He is the namesake of the city of Dawson, Minnesota.

References

Mayors of Saint Paul, Minnesota
Politicians from County Cavan
1825 births
1901 deaths
Irish emigrants to the United States (before 1923)